Airline Transport Pilot may refer to:
A holder of an Airline Transport Pilot License (an aviation certificate)
Flight Assignment: A.T.P., an MS-DOS game